Primula secundiflora (偏花报春 pian hua bao chun), the second-flowered primrose, is a species of flowering plant in the family Primulaceae, native to western China (E Qinghai, W Sichuan, E Xizang, NW Yunnan)., where it inhabits wet places at . It belongs to the Candelabra group of primulas (sect. Proliferae).

This plant is sometimes cultivated. It prefers neutral or acid soil, and is especially suitable for moist places such as the banks of streams or ponds, in partial shade.

References 

secundiflora
Flora of China